Matthew Cooke (born August 5, 1979) is an American former professional road cyclist.

Major results

2006
 1st Overall Green Mountain Stage Race
1st Stages 2 & 3
2012
 1st Stage 3 Tour de Beauce
 1st Stage 2 Sea Otter Classic
2013
 1st  Mountains classification, USA Pro Cycling Challenge
 5th Overall Tour de Beauce
 4th Overall Tour of the Gila
2014
 3rd Bucks County Classic
 6th Overall Tour of the Gila

References

External links

1979 births
Living people
American male cyclists